Open Seas is a 2018 Dutch drama film directed by Michiel van Erp. It was based on the book of the same name by Philip Huff. In July 2019, it was shortlisted as one of the nine films in contention to be the Dutch entry for the Academy Award for Best International Feature Film at the 92nd Academy Awards, but it was not selected.

Cast
 Julia Akkermans as Elisabeth de Vries
 Anneke Blok as Moeder Philip
 Jacqueline Blom as Moeder Elisabeth

References

External links
 

2018 films
2018 drama films
Dutch drama films
2010s Dutch-language films